The Abyss is a 1988 drama film directed by André Delvaux. It was entered into the 1988 Cannes Film Festival. It is based on the novel of the same name by Marguerite Yourcenar. The film received the André Cavens Award for Best Film by the Belgian Film Critics Association (UCC).

Background
In the 16th century, the Duke of Alba crushed the rebellion of Flanders against Spain. The strict Catholic King Philip II of Spain (1556-1598), restricted religious freedom and applied the decrees of the Council of Trent which strengthened the power of the Inquisition in Flanders. During this turbulent period, the venerable writer and philosopher Zénon Ligre arrived in Bruges.

Plot
The doctor and alchemist Zénon Ligre returns to his country of origin Flanders using false documentation, after spending his life traveling around Europe. In his hometown of Bruges, he finds work as a doctor in the convent of the Cordeliers. After founding a clinic and spa, he sets out to work as a doctor and alchemist for the poor. Zénon‘s ideology and methods were very popular among the Flemish population, but they ran the risk of being condemned by the Inquisition because they deviated from official orthodoxy. Having engaged in bisexual relations for several years, Zénon is accused of having homosexual relations with a young friar. Long sought after by authorities for his subversive writings, Zénon is arrested. He is tried by a court of the Inquisition and accused of witchcraft, murder, and unnatural relations. Rather than be burned at the stake, he prefers to choose his own death.

Cast
 Gian Maria Volonté as Zénon
 Sami Frey as Prieur des Cordeliers
 Jacques Lippe as Myers
 Anna Karina as Catherine
 Philippe Léotard as Henri-Maximilien
 Jean Bouise as Campanus
 Marie-Christine Barrault as Hilzonde
 Marie-France Pisier as Martha
 Mathieu Carrière as Pierre de Hamaere
 Pierre Dherte as Cyprien
 Johan Leysen as Rombaut
 Dora van der Groen as Greete
 Senne Rouffaer as Le Cocq
 Geert Desmet as Han
 Michel Poncelet as Josse

References

External links

L'Œuvre au noir at filmsdefrance.com

1988 films
1980s historical drama films
French historical drama films
Belgian historical drama films
Films about suicide
Films directed by André Delvaux
Films based on works by Marguerite Yourcenar
Films scored by Frédéric Devreese
Films set in the 16th century
Films set in Bruges
Films shot in Bruges
1988 drama films
1980s French-language films
1980s French films